Platt is a ghost town in Angelina County, in the U.S. state of Texas. It is located within the Lufkin, Texas micropolitan area.

History
There were several sawmills built in the area by Luke Wright, J.V. Lankford, and F.L. Dunham during and after World War II. The amount of wood ran out in the 1920s. A post office was established at Platt in 1902 and remained in operation until 1913 when mail was delivered from Manton. William L. Singleton was the postmaster. The community had a general store operated by J.C. McKinney and had 50 residents in 1910. There were two other mills named North and Old Platt, all three of which shut down in 1949.

Geography
Platt was located on the Texas and New Orleans Railroad near Huntington in north-central Angelina County.

Education
Platt had a one-room school in 1910. Today, the ghost town is located within the Lufkin Independent School District.

See also
List of ghost towns in Texas

References

Geography of Angelina County, Texas
Ghost towns in East Texas